Joseph Matthew Gaziano (born September 27, 1996) is an American football defensive end for the Los Angeles Chargers of the National Football League (NFL). He played college football at Northwestern.

Early life and high school
Gaziano grew up in Scituate, Massachusetts and attended Xaverian Brothers High School, where he played football and lacrosse. He was named the Massachusetts Gatorade Player of the Year as a senior after recording 21 tackles for loss and 16 sacks.

College career
Gaziano was a member of the Northwestern Wildcats for five seasons, redshirting his true freshman year. He finished his collegiate career with school records of 30 sacks and 10 forced fumbles and second all-time with 48.5 tackles for loss with 153 total tackles, four fumbles recovered, 15 passes defended and a blocked kick in 52 games played.

Professional career

Gaziano was signed by the Los Angeles Chargers as an undrafted free agent on April 25, 2020. He was waived at the end of training camp during final roster cuts on September 5, 2020, and signed to the practice squad on September 10, 2020. He was elevated to the active roster on October 12 and December 26 for the team's weeks 5 and 16 games against the New Orleans Saints and Denver Broncos, and reverted to the practice squad after each game. On January 1, 2021, Gaziano was signed to the active roster.

On August 31, 2021, Gaziano was waived by the Chargers and re-signed to the practice squad the next day. He was activated for the Chargers' week 2 game against the Cowboys. He was signed to the active roster on October 1.

On August 30, 2022, Gaziano was waived by the Chargers and signed to the practice squad the next day. He was promoted to the active roster on November 19. He was placed on injured reserve on December 21.

References

External links
Los Angeles Chargers bio
Northwestern Wildcats football bio

1996 births
Living people
Players of American football from Massachusetts
American football defensive ends
Northwestern Wildcats football players
People from Scituate, Massachusetts
Los Angeles Chargers players
Sportspeople from Plymouth County, Massachusetts
Xaverian Brothers High School alumni